Arotrophora khunmaei is a species of moth of the family Tortricidae. It is found in Thailand.

The wingspan is about 18 mm. The ground colour of forewings is greyish brown, dotted with black and with brown markings, as well as black strigulae (fine streaks) along the costa and a row of dots along the termen. The hindwings are brownish.

Etymology
The species name refers to Khun Mae Ngaay, the type locality.

References

Moths described in 2009
Arotrophora
Moths of Asia